The South Africa national cricket team toured England between 16 May and 20 August 1901. They played 15 first-class cricket matches, and 10 other matches during their visit. Although a number of matches played by South Africa during the 1880s and 1890s were retrospectively granted Test cricket status, as the 1901 touring side did not play a representative England side, they did not compete in any Test matches. The South Africans were captained by Murray Bisset. The tour went ahead despite the ongoing Boer War, which suspended first-class cricket in South Africa between 1899 and 1902.

During the tour, Maitland Hathorn was the most successful batsman for the South Africans, scoring 827 runs at a batting average of 35.95. George Rowe was the tourists' leading wicket taker, with 70 wickets, but Jimmy Sinclair had the superior bowling average, claiming his 61 wickets at 19.85.

Touring party

Tour itinerary
Only matches accorded first-class status are numbered:

Notes

References

External links

1901 in English cricket
1901 in South African cricket
International cricket competitions from 1888–89 to 1918
1901